Egerton University is a public university in Kenya. It is the oldest institution of higher education in Kenya.

Location

History
The school was founded in 1939, and was originally named Egerton Farm School. It was established by a large land grant of 740 acres (3 km²) by Maurice Egerton, 4th Baron Egerton of Tatton. The school's original purpose was to prepare white European youth for careers in agriculture. By 1955, the name had changed to Egerton Agricultural College. A one-year certificate course and a two-year diploma course in agriculture were offered. In 1958, Lord Egerton donated another  of land. Soon afterwards, the college opened its doors to people of all races from Kenya and other African countries.

In 1979, with support from the Government of Kenya and USAID, the college expanded yet again, becoming part of the University of Nairobi system. In 1987, the college was recognized as a chartered public university.

University ranking

 Ranked First (1st) in Kenya on Impact Ranking by webometrics (July, 2021 Rankings)

University governance
 Office of the Chancellor.
 The University Council.
 The University Management Board (UMB).
 The University Senate.

University management
 Office of the Vice-Chancellor.
 Division of Academic Affairs (AA).
 Division of Administration, Planning and Development (APD).
 Division of Research and Extension (R&E).
 Office of the Principals.
 Directorates and Boards.
 Deans of Faculties.

Campuses
Egerton University has three campuses, one of them being a constituent college. 
 The main campus is based at Njoro and houses the faculties of Agriculture, Arts & Social Sciences, Education & Community Studies, Engineering & Technology, Environment & Resources Development, Science & Veterinary Medicine.
 Nakuru Town Campus College, which is the only University’s Campus College and hosts the Faculties of Commerce, Health Sciences and Law.

Directorates and boards

Institutes of Egerton University

 The Institute of Women, Gender and Development Studies (IWGDs)
 Tegemeo Institute of Agricultural Policy and Development
 Confucius Institute

Schools

 School of Open and Distance Learning (SoDL)

Faculties of Egerton University
The University has ten (10) faculties, subdivided into fifty three (53) academic departments offering programmes at diploma, undergraduate, and postgraduate levels: 
 Faculty of Agriculture
 Faculty of Arts and Social Sciences
 Faculty of Commerce
 Faculty of Education and Community Studies
 Faculty of Engineering and Technology
 Faculty of Environment and Resource Development
 Faculty of Health Sciences
 Faculty of Law
 Faculty of Science
 Faculty of Veterinary Medicine & Surgery

Academic departments

The Academic Departments responsible for teaching and learning.

Research departments

Administrative departments

Courses offered

The university offers many academic programs. Students can receive a three-year diploma, a bachelor's degree, master's degree, or a doctorate (PhD).

In 2004, the university established a partnership with Western Michigan University that allows students to complete half of their degree at Egerton and finish their studies at WMU in a choice of computer science, engineering and business administration.

Flagship research projects 

 Chemeron Dryland Research Training & Ecotourism Centre - DRTEC
 Njoro River Rehabilitation Project
 Agro-Science Park.
 Transforming African Agricultural Universities to Meaningfully Contribute to Africa’s Growth and Development (TAGDev)
 Centre of Excellence in Sustainable Agriculture and Agribusiness Management (CESAAM)
 Faculty of Law Legal Aid Project (FOLLAP)

Notable alumni

 Hon. Amb. Ukur Yatani Kanacho, Cabinet Secretary, National Treasury & Planning, Kenya.
 Prof. John Krop Lonyangapuo, Second governor of West Pokot county
 Hon. Salim Mvurya, Governor, Kwale County, Kenya.
 Mr Peter Tabichi, Winner of the global prize for the world's best teacher and one of the TOP most influential Africans.
 Hon. Anne Waiguru, former Cabinet Secretary and Governor of Kirinyaga County.

See also
 List of universities in Kenya
 Education in Kenya
 Maurice Egerton, 4th Baron Egerton
 Egerton family
 Lord Egerton Castle

References

External links
 

Egerton University
Nakuru
Education in Nakuru County
Buildings and structures in Rift Valley Province
Educational institutions established in 1939
1939 establishments in Kenya
Kenya in World War II
Universities in Kenya